Vampire's Kiss is a 1988 American black comedy horror film directed by Robert Bierman and written by Joseph Minion. Starring Nicolas Cage, María Conchita Alonso, Jennifer Beals, and Elizabeth Ashley, the film tells the story of a literary agent who falls in love with a vampire. It was a box office failure but went on to become a cult film.

Plot 

Peter Loew is a driven literary agent and an example of the stereotypical narcissistic and greedy yuppie of the 1980s: he works all day and club hops at night, with little in his life but alcohol, cocaine, one-night stands with numerous women, and the pursuit of money and supposed prestige. However, he is slowly going insane and sees a therapist frequently. During these sessions, his declining mental health becomes clear through a series of increasingly bizarre rants which eventually begin to scare the psychiatrist. After taking home a girl named Jackie from a club, a bat flies in through his window, scaring them both. At his next session he mentions to his therapist that the struggle with the bat aroused him. While visiting an art museum with Jackie the next day, he ditches her, and she later leaves an angry message on his phone.

Loew meets Rachel at a night club, and seemingly takes her home. As they make love, she pins him down, exposing vampire fangs, and bites him on the neck. The following morning, Loew is seen with an uninjured neck, serving coffee and making conversation with a non-existent Rachel, casting doubt on the reality of the previous night's events.

Loew cuts his neck shaving and applies a bandage to the spot, thereafter believing it to be the location of his vampire bite. He soon believes that he is turning into a vampire. He fails to see his reflection in mirrors and wears dark sunglasses indoors. When his fangs fail to develop, he purchases a pair of cheap plastic novelty fangs. All the while, he has delusions of Rachel visiting him nightly to feed on his blood. Shortly after, Loew experiences severe mood swings and calls Jackie back apologetically, asking to meet her at a bar. As he is about to leave, a jealous Rachel appears and beckons him back inside. A dejected Jackie eventually leaves the bar and leaves an angry note on his door asking him to leave her alone.

Loew constantly torments a secretary working at his office named Alva Restrepo, typically by forcing her to search through an enormous paper file for a contract. When she fails to find the contract, he at first browbeats and humiliates her, then visits her at home and tricks her into returning to work, and finally attacks and attempts to bite her at the workplace after hours. She pulls out a gun, and Loew begs her to shoot him. Since it is only loaded with blanks, she fires at the floor to scare him off. He eventually overpowers her, ripping her shirt open, pinning her to the floor as he attempts to bite her neck, while hallucinating that she is Rachel. Afterwards, overcome by despair, he takes the gun and fires it into his mouth, but is not harmed, attributing it to his supposed transformation.

Thinking he is a vampire, Loew goes out to a club wearing his novelty fangs and moves around erratically like the character Orlok from the film Nosferatu with a crazed look in his eyes. He begins to seduce a woman, but when he gets too grabby she slaps him, making Loew even more unhinged. He overpowers her and bites her neck, having taken out the fangs and using his real teeth, leaving the woman unconscious and bloody. He hallucinates another encounter with a disdainful Rachel.

Afterwards, Loew encounters the real Rachel dancing with another man on the dance floor. She appears to recognize him, but gives the impression that they have not been in contact for a long time. Loew attempts to manhandle her into revealing her fangs as her date fights him off. He screams that he loves her and accuses her of being a vampire as he is dragged off and expelled from the club by security.

Alva wakes up with her shirt ripped open, possibly thinking she was raped, and eventually tells her brother Emilio who is enraged and goes after Loew with Alva to seek revenge. Meanwhile, Loew is wandering the streets, disheveled in a blood-spattered business suit from the previous night, excitedly talking to himself. Standing on a street corner, he has a hallucinatory exchange with his therapist, claiming that he raped someone and murdered someone else; a nearby newspaper headline confirms the latter. As Loew returns to his now-destroyed apartment, Alva points him out to Emilio, who pursues him inside the apartment block with a tire iron.

In the midst of an abusive argument with an imaginary romantic interest (supposedly a patient of his psychiatrist) Loew begins to retch again from the blood he had swallowed, then crawls under his upturned sofa on the floor, as though it were a coffin. Emilio finds Loew and upturns the sofa. Loew holds a large broken piece of wood to his chest as a makeshift stake, repeating the gesture he had made earlier to strangers on the street when he had asked them to kill him. Emilio pushes down on the wood and it pierces Loew's chest in a gruesome manner. Emilio flees the apartment. As Loew dies, he envisions the vampire Rachel staring at him one last time.

Cast

 Nicolas Cage as Peter Loew, a literary critic whose outlandish descent into madness leaves him increasingly isolated
 María Conchita Alonso as Alva Restrepo, secretary to Loew and constant victim to his rants and impatience 
 Jennifer Beals as Rachel, the seductive vampire that initially haunts Loew and pushes him into his vampire-like state; but eventually falls in love with him
 Kasi Lemmons as Jackie, a romantic interest of Loew which he later stands up in favor of a night with Rachel
 Bob Lujan as Emilio, the protective brother of Alva who supplies her with a gun and blank ammunition
 Elizabeth Ashley as Dr. Glaser, the therapist in Loew's real and imaginary worlds

In addition, Jessica Lundy plays Sharon, the patient his therapist sets Peter up with, Cage's brother Marc Coppola briefly appears as the joke guy, and the musical group ESG has a cameo performing in a club.

Production 
Written "as darkly comic and deft as its bizarre premise," Joseph Minion wrote the film as he grappled with depression. In an interview with Zach Schonfeld of The Ringer, Minion said that while on vacation in Barbados with his then-girlfriend, Barbara Zitwer, he wrote the screenplay as a response to his "toxic relationship" with her. Dealing with themes of isolation, loneliness, and domination, Zitwer, who would come on as a producer for the film, found the final product to be "horrifying." The story was extremely emblematic of their relationship together and Minion's depiction of Zitwer as a "vampire and destroying him," was clear foreshadowing to their end of their relationship during production. Known previously for having written After Hours, directed by Martin Scorsese, Minion sought to keep the "grim view of the Manhattan nightlife," found in the aforementioned film central to his newest work.

Originally intent on taking the helm of directing the project, Minion soon gave the position up stating that the “darkness of it,” was too much for him to bear. Instead, the film was led by British newcomer Robert Bierman who held previous experience working on commercials and short films such as The Rocking Horse Winner (1983) and The Dumb Waiter (1979). This sudden departure however also prompted the then cast Nicolas Cage to drop out after his agent pressured him stating "this was not a good movie to make after Moonstruck." His departure was short lived however and Cage's "outrageously unbridled performance," was destined for the screen. Cage described the story as being about "a man whose loneliness and inability to find love literally drives him insane".

The role of Peter Loew was originally given to Dennis Quaid, then passed on to Cage after the former dropped out to do Innerspace. Cage and Beals reportedly did not get along on set with their friction most likely stemming from the part of Rachel going to Beals rather than Cage's then-girlfriend, Patricia Arquette.

Going purposefully against the method acting technique, Cage "took a highly surrealistic approach" to Loew.  Apart from his “pseudo-Trannsylvanian dialect,” scenes of Cage screaming the alphabet, eating cockroaches, and ranting "I'm a vampire!" shocked viewers and critics alike. The original script called for Loew to eat a raw egg but Cage decided a cockroach would be more effective claiming it would "shock the audience." This shock was further extended to a couple of real homeless people who Cage ran into on the streets of Manhattan as he pleaded with them to drive a stake through his heart as Bierman and crew shot from afar. Physicality played a central role in the creation of this character for Cage who in several terrifying scenes sought to see "how big [he] could get [his] eyes." This was then furthered with scenes of Cage jumping on tables, sprinting across the office, and many frantic hand gestures which he claims were "extremely choreographed."

While many such as Hal Hinson of The Washington Post criticized this style of "scorched-earth acting," it cemented the film as a cult classic and become the source of many internet memes.

Release
Vampire's Kiss was released June 2, 1989. It grossed $725,131 in the U.S. It was released on home video in August 1990. MGM released it on DVD in August 2002, and Scream Factory released it on Blu-ray in February 2015. It was subsequently re-released on Blu-Ray through the MVD Rewind label in June, 2022.

Reception
Vampire's Kiss was considered a commercial flop upon its initial release but has developed a cult following since that time.  Metacritic assigned the film a weighted average score of 30 out of 100, based on 11 critics, indicating "generally unfavorable reviews".

Variety wrote, "Cage's over-the-top performance generates little sympathy for the character, so it’s tough to be interested in him as his personality disorder worsens." Caryn James of The New York Times wrote, "[T]he film is dominated and destroyed by Mr. Cage's chaotic, self-indulgent performance." Kevin Thomas of the Los Angeles Times called it "a sleek, outrageous dark comedy that's all the funnier for constantly teetering on the brink of sheer tastelessness and silliness." Hal Hinson of The Washington Post called the film "stone-dead bad, incoherently bad", but said that Cage's overacting must be seen to be believed. Carrie Rickey of The Philadelphia Inquirer called it an "imaginative, if warped, black comedy" that "succeeds as a wicked allegory of What Men Want". Rolling Stone critic Peter Travers wrote that the film needs "a stake through the heart". Reviewing the film on Blu-ray, Anthony Arrigo of Bloody Disgusting wrote, "The film may not work very well as a comedy, but there's enough of a dark derangement present to make it almost unsettling."

See also
Vampire film

References

External links
 
 
 

1989 films
1989 independent films
1980s black comedy films
1980s comedy horror films
American black comedy films
American comedy horror films
Vampire comedy films
Films set in New York City
Films shot in New York City
Films set in the 1980s
Films scored by Colin Towns
1989 directorial debut films
1989 comedy films
American psychological horror films
American exploitation films
1980s English-language films
Films directed by Robert Bierman
1980s American films